Shchukin or Schukin is a male Russian surname. Its feminine counterpart is Shchukina or Schukina. It may refer to
Albert Shchukin (born 1971), Russian association football coach and player
 Aleksandr Vladimirovich Shchukin (1946–1988), Soviet test pilot and cosmonaut
 Aleksandr Yuryevich Shchukin (1969–2000), Russian professional footballer
Anatoly Shchukin (1916–1983), Soviet stage and voice actor
Boris Shchukin (1894–1939), Soviet actor
Lev Schukin (1923–2009), Soviet fighter pilot
Sergei Shchukin (1854–1936), Russian businessman and art collector
Stepan Shchukin (1754–1828), Russian portrait and watercolor painter
Vladimir Shchukin (born 1952), Soviet Olympic gymnast
Yuri Schukin (born 1979), Russian-born Kazakhstani tennis player
Anna Shchukina (born 1987), Russian Olympic ice hockey player
Olga Shchukina (born 1977), Olympic shot putter from Uzbekistan

Russian-language surnames